Demirhanlar may refer to the following places in Turkey:

 Demirhanlar, Gölpazarı, a village in the district of Gölpazarı, Bilecik Province
 Demirhanlar, Göynük, a village in the district of Göynük, Bolu Province

See also
 Demirhan (disambiguation)